The National Trust and English Heritage are the best known building conservation trusts in the United Kingdom for the protection of listed buildings and buildings of architectural importance. The Churches Conservation Trust, which was initially known as the Redundant Churches Fund, is a UK charity whose purpose is to protect historic churches at risk, those that have been made redundant by the Church of England. The Landmark Trust is a British building conservation charity, founded in 1965 by Sir John and Lady Smith, that rescues buildings of historic interest or architectural merit and then makes them available for holiday rental. There are many buildings within the United Kingdom that are not under the care of any of the aforementioned trusts but are recognised for their importance by local conservation and preservation groups. These groups are listed below:

UK

 Society for the Protection of Ancient Buildings

England
 Bath Preservation Trust
 Birmingham Conservation Trust
 Friends of Moulton Mill, Lincolnshire
Friends of Bank Hall, Lancashire
 Friends of Victoria Baths, Manchester
 Friends of Williamson's Tunnels, Liverpool
 Heritage Trust for the North West
 Lion Salt Works Trust, Cheshire
Norfolk Churches Trust
 Poltimore House Trust, Devon
 Somerset Buildings Preservation Trust
 Todmorden Moor Restoration Trust, West Yorkshire
 Wentworth Castle Trust, South Yorkshire
 Wiltshire Historic Buildings Trust
 York Conservation Trust

Ireland
 Belfast Buildings Preservation Trust
 Friends of Lissan Trust

Scotland
  Kinloch Castle Friends Association
 Mavisbank Trust

Wales
 Ruperra Castle Preservation Trust
 Friends of Newbridge Memo

See also

 Architectural Heritage Fund
 Building Preservation Trust
 Friends of Friendless Churches
 U.K. Association of Building Preservation Trusts

References

Building Preservation Trusts